The ashy-gray tube-nosed bat (Murina cineracea) is a species in the vesper bat family Vespertilionidae, found in southern Asia, including Pakistan, northern India, Burma, Thailand, Laos, and Vietnam. They have tube-shaped nostrils (hence the name) which assist them with their feeding.

The ashy-gray bat is one of 126 new species found in the Greater Mekong region during 2011.  There were two other tube-nosed bats found in Southeast Asia in 2011: Beelzebub's tube-nosed bat (Murina beelzebub) and Walston's tube-nosed bat (Murina walstoni). All three species are small for bats and M. cineracea is small for a Murina bat. These three new tube-nosed bats were discovered by a team from the Hungarian Natural History Museum (HNHM) and Fauna and Flora International (FFI). All three of these bats live in tropical forests, making them endangered by deforestation.

The name "ashy-gray" comes from the color of their dorsal fur, while the ventral fur is dark gray, and there is some white fur on the breast area. In some areas the tips of the hair are dark. It lacks the golden guard hairs so common in other members of the genus Murina. This bat is small enough to fit in a person's hand, weighing . As of 2013, there are still few details known about them and their ecology and it is suspected there are many more species of bats yet to be discovered in the region.

Vespertilionid bats have many cryptic species. As an example, the members of the ashy-gray bat were formerly classified as Scully's tube-nosed bat (Murina tubinaris). Eight new species were found in Southeast Asia between 2005-2009. The use of DNA technology has proved very useful in differentiating between the various species of Murina.

See also 

 Peter's tube-nosed bat

References

Further reading 
 
 
 
 
 
 
 

Murininae
Bats of South Asia
Bats of Southeast Asia
Bats of India
Mammals of Myanmar
Mammals of Laos
Mammals of Pakistan
Mammals of Thailand
Mammals of Vietnam
Mammals described in 2011